San Pedro de Cajas District is one of nine districts of the province Tarma in Peru.

Geography 
Some of the highest mountains of the district are listed below:

See also 
 Qanchisqucha
 Waskaqucha

References

External links
  Municipal web site